Purbeckodon is an extinct genus of mammaliaforms, possibly belonging to Morganucodonta, that is known from Early Cretaceous deposits of southeastern Dorset, England. It was collected in the Purbeck Limestone Group of Dorset. It was first named by Percy M. Butler, Denise Sigogneau-Russell and P. C. Ensom in 2011 and the type species is Purbeckodon batei.

References

Morganucodonts
Berriasian life
Early Cretaceous animals of Europe
Early Cretaceous synapsids
Cretaceous England
Fossils of England
Fossil taxa described in 2011
History of Dorset
Taxa named by Percy M. Butler
Taxa named by Denise Sigogneau‐Russell
Prehistoric cynodont genera